The Centre for Ibsen Studies at the University of Oslo engages in multidisciplinary research, teaching, and documentation on the nineteenth-century Norwegian playwright Henrik Ibsen.

History 
The Centre was established by the university in 1991 and opened in 1993. From 2000 to 2010, the Centre was housed in the Oslo Observatory, the university's oldest building. In January 2010 it moved to Henrik Wergelands hus at the Blindern campus. 

Documentation and dissemination of information are key aspects of the Centre’s mission. It holds a library with the world's most complete collection of books and articles relating to Ibsen Studies and maintains The Virtual Ibsen Centre. Research areas include textual studies, performance studies, reception studies, and theatre history. The Centre offers a two-year Master’s programme in Ibsen Studies, as well as a number of courses at Bachelor’s level.

Since 2007 the Centre has arranged an Annual Ibsen Lecture each fall.
The Centre for Ibsen Studies also edits the international journal Ibsen Studies, which is published by Taylor & Francis.

Digital Resources
The Centre has developed extensive digital resources that are freely available online at The Virtual Ibsen Center. These resources include  IbsenStage, an event-based, relational database containing data on over 20,000 performances from around the globe and from 1850 to the present. Others resources are the electronic commented edition of Henrik Ibsen's writings in the original Norwegian, open access translations of Ibsen’s works to other languages, The International Ibsen Bibliography, and an archive of related texts, images and audio recordings.

References

External links
 Centre for Ibsen Studies at the University of Oslo
Centre Director: Ellen Rees (Acting Centre Director: Liyang Xia).

University of Oslo
Henrik Ibsen